Brushy Fork is the name of three streams in the United States:

 Brushy Fork (Tavern Creek tributary), Missouri
 Brushy Fork (Pauls Creek tributary), North Carolina
 Brushy Fork, West Virginia - see Brushy Fork Coal Impoundment